Derrick W. Graham (born in Frankfort, Kentucky) is an American politician and a Democratic member of the Kentucky House of Representatives representing District 57 since January 2003.

Education
Graham earned his BA in history and political science from Kentucky State University and his MA in political science from Ohio State University.

Elections
2012 Graham was unopposed for the May 22, 2012 Democratic Primary and won the November 6, 2012 General election with 11,639 votes (63.9%) against Republican nominee Donald Stosberg, who had run for the seat in 2000 and 2002, and for Agricultural Commissioner in 2007.
1994 When the District 57 seat was open, Graham ran in the seven-way 1994 Democratic Primary but lost to Gippy Graham, who was unopposed for the November 8, 1994 General election.
2002 When Representative Gippy Graham left the Legislature and left the seat open, Derrick Graham won the four-way 2002 Democratic Primary with 5,023 votes (44.7%) and won the November 5, 2002 General election with 8,209 votes (61.9%) against Republican nominee Joel Schrader.
2004 Graham was unopposed for both the 2004 Democratic Primary and the November 2, 2004 General election, winning with 14,432 votes.
2006 Graham was unopposed for both the 2006 Democratic Primary and the November 7, 2006 General election, winning with 11,938 votes.
2008 Graham was unopposed for the 2008 Democratic Primary and won the November 4, 2008 General election with 14,015 votes (74.7%) against Republican nominee Frank Haynes.
2010 Graham was unopposed for the May 18, 2010 Democratic Primary and won the November 2, 2010 General election with 11,282 votes (67.0%) against Republican nominee Paul Estep.

References

External links
Official page at the Kentucky General Assembly
Campaign site

Derrick Graham at Ballotpedia
Derrick W. Graham at the National Institute on Money in State Politics

Year of birth missing (living people)
Living people
African-American state legislators in Kentucky
African-American schoolteachers
Kentucky State University alumni
Democratic Party members of the Kentucky House of Representatives
Ohio State University Graduate School alumni
Politicians from Frankfort, Kentucky
21st-century American politicians
21st-century African-American politicians